Ivan I may refer to:

Ivan I Debranin, first Archbishop of Ochrid (11th-century)
Ivan I of Moscow (1288–1340), Prince of Moscow
Ivan I Crnojević of Zeta (r. 1465–1490)